Susan-e Gharbi Rural District is a rural district (dehestan) in Susan District, Izeh County, Khuzestan Province, Iran. At the 2006 census, its population was 11,022, in 1,906 families.  The rural district has 79 villages.

References 

Rural Districts of Khuzestan Province
Izeh County